Arturo Michelena International Airport  is an airport serving the city of Valencia in Venezuela. The airport was named after artist Arturo Michelena, who was born in Valencia. It is a hub for Turpial Airlines and a secondary hub for Avior Airlines.

Airlines and destinations

See also
Transport in Venezuela
List of airports in Venezuela

References

External links 

OurAirports - Valencia
SkyVector - Valencia Airport

Airports in Venezuela
Buildings and structures in Valencia, Venezuela